Esteghlal Football Club (Bashgah-e Futbal-e Esteqlâl), commonly known as Esteghlal (meaning 'The Independence'), is an Iranian football club based in capital Tehran, that competes in the Persian Gulf Pro League. The club was founded in 1945 as Docharkheh Savaran (meaning 'The Cyclists') and previously known as Taj (meaning 'The Crown') between 1949 and 1979.

This page details Esteghlal Football Club records and statistics.

Honours

Esteghlal is the most proud team of Iran with 38 official championship titles in provincial, national and continental cups.

Domestic

League

Iran League
 Winners (9): 1970–71, 1974–75, 1989–90, 1997–98, 2000–01, 2005–06, 2008–09, 2012–13, 2021–22
 Runners-up (10): 1973–74, 1991–92, 1994–95, 1998–99, 1999–2000, 2001–02, 2003–04, 2010–11, 2016–17, 2019–20
Iran Championship
 Winners (1): 1957

Cups
Hazfi Cup (record)
 Winners (7): 1976–77, 1995–96, 1999–2000, 2001–02, 2007–08, 2011–12, 2017–18
 Runners-up (6): 1989–90, 1998–99, 2003–04, 2015–16, 2019–20, 2020–21

Super Cup
 Winners (1): 2022
 Runners-up (1): 2018

Provincial (High Level)
Tehran League (record)
 Winners (13): 1949–50, 1952–53, 1956–57, 1957–58, 1959–60, 1960–61, 1962–63, 1968–69, 1970–1971, 1972–73, 1983–84, 1985–86, 1991–92
 Runners-up (7): 1946–47, 1951–52, 1958–59, 1969–70, 1982–83, 1989–90, 1990–91
Tehran Hazfi Cup
 Winners (4): 1946–47, 1950–51, 1958–59, 1960–61
 Runners-up (3): 1945–46, 1957–58, 1969–70
Tehran Super Cup (shared record)
 Winners (1): 1994

Continental
AFC Champions League (Iran record)
 Winners (2): 1970, 1990–91
 Runners-up (2): 1991, 1998–99
 Third place (3): 1971, 2001–02, 2013

Doubles and Treble
Esteghlal has achieved the Double on 5 occasions in its history:

 Iran League and Tehran League
 1957–58 Season
 1970–71 Season

 Tehran League and Tehran Hazfi Cup
 1958–59 Season
 1960–61 Season

 AFC Champions League and Tehran League
 1990–91 Season

Esteghlal has achieved the Treble on 1 occasions in its history:

 AFC Champions League and Iran League and Tehran League
 1970–71 Season

Minor Tournaments

International

 DCM Trophy
Winners (4): 1969, 1970, 1971, 1989
 Bordoloi Trophy
Winners (1): 1989
 Qatar Independence Cup
Winners (1): 1991
 Turkmenistan President's Cup
Winners (1): 1998
 Caspian International Cup
Winners (1): 1998

Domestic
 Taj Cup
Winner (1): 1958
 Doosti Cup
Winners (1): 1972
 Ettehad Cup
Winners (1): 1973
 Basij Festival
Winner (1): 1992
 Iran Third Division
Winner (1): 1993
 Kish Quartet Competition Cup
Winners (1): 1998
 Iranian Football League Cup
Winners (1): 2002
 Solh va Doosti Cup
Winners (1): 2005

Rankings 
The club is currently ranked 160 in the world by IFFHS.

Top Ten Asian's clubs of the 20th Century 
Esteghlal was placed 3rd in IFFHS continental Clubs of the 20th Century:

Statistics

Statistics in IPL
 Seasons in IPL: 21 (all)
 Best position in IPL: First (2005–06, 2008–2009, 2012–13 , 2021-22)
 Worst position in IPL: 13 (2007–08)
 Most goals scored in a season: 70 (2008–09)
 Most goals scored in a match: 6 – 0 (1 time)
 Most goals conceded in a match: 4 – 1 (3 times)

Statistics in ACL
 Most goals scored in a match: 8 – 0 (1 time)
 Most goals conceded in a match: 1 – 6 (1 time)

Statistics in Hazfi Cup
 Most goals scored in a match: 13 – 0 (1 time)
 Most goals conceded in a match: 0 – 3 (1 time)

Player records

Appearances

 Most League Appearances: Amir Hossein Sadeghi (258)
 Most League Goalkeeper Appearances: Vahid Talebloo (196)
Player who has won most IPL titles: Mojtaba Jabbari (with  3 Championships)

Goalscorers
 All-time top scorer: Arash Borhani with 107 goals
 All-time League top scorer: Arash Borhani with 80 goals
 All-time AFC Champions League top scorer: Farhad Majidi with 14 goals
 Most goals in a season : 27 (Arash Borhani, 2008–09)
 Most League goals in a season : 21 (Reza Enayati, 2005–06)
 Most AFC Champions League goals in a season : 6 (Abdolsamad Marfavi, 1990–91)
 Most goals in an Hazfi Cup match : 5 (Arash Borhani)
 Most goals in an AFC Champions League match : 3 (Ali Jabbari) & (Mame Baba Thiam)
 First Goalscorer in Tehran derby: Ahmad Monshizadeh
 Most Goalscorer in Tehran derby: 5 (Gholam Hossein Mazloumi)

Top goalscorers

Managerial records 

 First full-time manager: Ali Danaeifard managed Taj from March 1946 to August 1953
 Longest-serving manager: Ali Danaeifard – 14 years from 1953 to May 1967
 Shortest tenure as manager: Mick McDermott (caretaker) – 12 days from 21 September 2017 to 2 October 2017
 Highest win percentage: Parviz Koozehkanani (caretaker) 100%
 Lowest win percentage: Javad Zarincheh (caretaker) 0%

See also
Esteghlal F.C.

References

External links
 
 

Esteghlal F.C.
Football clubs in Iran